

The Roque Chico de Salmor giant lizard (Gallotia simonyi simonyi) was the nominate subspecies of the lacertid (wall lizard) Gallotia simonyi. It was once present on a small islet near El Hierro in the Canary Islands.

Gallotia simonyi simonyi was only known from Roque Chico de Salmor off northwestern Valverde municipality, El Hierro. It disappeared around the 1930s through unsustainable collecting of animals for scientific institutions and commercial interests, as well as predation by feral cats and possibly herring gulls (Diaz & Bischoff 1994, Miras & Pérez-Mellado 2005).

See also
 List of extinct animals of Europe

References
 Blanco, Juan Carlos & González, José Luis (eds.) (1992): Libro rojo de los vertebrados de España. ICONA, Madrid.
 Böhme, W. & Bings, Werner (1975): Zur Frage des Überlebens von Lacerta s. simonyi Steindachner. Salamandra 11(1): 39–46. [Article in German]
 Diaz, Carlos Naeslund & Bischoff, Wolfgang (1994): Studien am Roque Chico de Salmor bei El Hierro (Kanaren): 1. Mögliche Ursachen für das Aussterben von Gallotia simonyi, 2. Die Artzugehörigkeit seiner Geckos (Tarentola). Salamandra 30(4): 246–253. [Article in German] HTML abstract
 European Environment Agency (2006): European Nature Information System (EUNIS): Species Factsheet: Gallotia simonyi simonyi. Downloaded on 24 Feb 2007.
 Maas, Peter H.J. (2006): The Extinction Website: Extinctions in Europe. Downloaded on 18 May 2006.
  Database entry includes a range map and justification for why this species is critically endangered

Footnotes

External links
 lacerta.de: Gallotia simonyi machadoi image gallery. Contains several good photos of habitat on Roque Chico de Salmor. Retrieved 2007-FEB-25.

Gallotia
Extinct reptiles
Reptile extinctions since 1500
Lizards of Europe
Reptiles of the Canary Islands
El Hierro
Taxa named by Franz Steindachner